Bordul may refer to:

Bordul, a tributary of the Cerna in Hunedoara County, Romania
Bordul, a tributary of the Nădrag in Timiș County, Romania

See also 
 Gura Bordului, a village in Hunedoara County, Romania